The term Sultan Palace or Sultan's Palace may refer to:

 Sultan's Palace, Zanzibar, in Tanzania
 the Kraton Ngayogyakarta Hadiningrat, in Yogyakarta, Indonesia
 Sultan Palace (Patna), in Patna, India

also: 
 Sultan Palace Hotel, in Sana'a, Yemen